Romeo, Juliet and Darkness is a 1960 Czech drama film directed by Jiří Weiss. Inspired by William Shakespeare's Romeo and Juliet, the film is about problems experienced by a young Jewish woman who is hidden from the Gestapo by a student lover. In 1997 a TV adaptation of the same name was directed by Karel Smyczek.

Cast
Ivan Mistrík as Pavel
Daniela Smutná as Hanka
Jiřina Šejbalová as Pavel's mother
František Smolík as Grandfather
Blanka Bohdanová as Kubiasová
Eva Mrázová as Alena
Karla Chadimová as Josefka
Miroslav Svoboda as Würm

Plot
In Nazi-occupied Prague in May 1942, Pavel (Ivan Mistrík) hides the young Jew Hanka (Daniela Smutná) to keep her from being sent to a concentration camp. Over the following three weeks the two fall in love. But when Hanka is discovered and Pavel is threatened, she flees into the streets in the middle of Operation Anthropoid—the Czech government-in-exile's plot to assassinate Reinhard Heydrich—and is killed.

Reception
Romeo, Juliet, and Darkness won the Golden Seashell at the 1960 San Sebastian International Film Festival. It also won the Grand Prix at the 1960 Taormina International Film Festival.

Notes

External links
 

1960 films
1960 drama films
1960s Czech-language films
Films directed by Jiří Weiss
Czech war drama films
Films based on Romeo and Juliet
1960s war drama films
Czech World War II films
Czechoslovak World War II films
1960s Czech films